Meet Yourself is a 2023 Chinese television drama series directed by Ding Zi Guang and starring Liu Yifei, Li Xian. It premiered on Hunan TV on January 3, 2023.

Synopsis 
Xu Hong Dou, a white-collared employee nearing her mid 30s, faced a major obstacle in life when her best friend unexpectedly fell ill with cancer and passed away. Distraught and unable to come to terms with her friend's death, Xu eventually found it tormenting to continue her working life in the city. She decided to quit her job and take a long break in a fictional rural village, Yun Miao, situated in Dali, Yunnan Province, Mainland China, a city her best friend had longed to visit with her. She subconsciously begins her journey to discover the meaning and way of life.

Cast 

 Liu Yifei as Xu Hongdou (许红豆)
 Li Xian as Xie Zhiyao (谢之遥)
 Hu Bing Qing as Lin Na (林娜)
 Gong Beibi as Xu Hongmi (许红米)
 Tu Songyan as Ma Qiushan (马丘山)
 Niu Junfeng as Hu Youyu (胡有鱼)
 Wu Yanshu as Granny Xie
 Dong Qing as Xie Xiaochun (谢晓春)
 Janice Wu as Chen Nanxing

References

External links 
 
 
 

Hunan Television dramas
Television series by Huace Media
2023 Chinese television series debuts
Television shows set in Yunnan
Television shows filmed in Yunnan